Relax, I'm from the Future is a Canadian science fiction comedy film, directed by Luke Higginson and released in 2022. The film stars Rhys Darby as Casper, a time traveller who arrives in the 2020s in an attempt to prevent a major future catastrophe; he meets Holly (Gabrielle Graham), a queer black woman he befriends and draws into his plan by giving her his knowledge of the future so that she can make quick money. However, they unwittingly alter the future themselves with their actions, until Doris (Janine Theriault), another time traveller, arrives to stop them.

Production and distribution
The film is an expansion of Higginson's 2015 short film of the same name, which starred Zachary Bennett as the time traveller and Rick Roberts as Percy, a man whose preparations to commit suicide the time traveller interrupts with the news that Percy isn't in the place where he's supposed to die. The feature film reenacts this scene, with Julian Richings in the role of Percy. Despite not playing the leading role in the full feature film, Bennett still appears in a supporting role.

The film's cast also includes Louisa Zhu, Marye Barton, Peter Valdron, John Cleland, Amanda Barker, Cyrena Fiel, Kristen Kurnik, Zoe Katz, Leah Brady, Emily Watt and Salvatore Scozzari, as well as an appearance by rock band PUP.

The film was shot in Hamilton, Ontario in fall 2021.

The film premiered at the 2022 Fantasia Film Festival, and is slated for commercial release in 2023.

Awards
At Fantasia, the film received a bronze medal in the Best Canadian Film competition.

References

External links

2022 films
2022 comedy films
2022 science fiction films
2022 LGBT-related films
Canadian science fiction comedy films
Canadian LGBT-related films
English-language Canadian films
Films shot in Hamilton, Ontario
LGBT-related comedy films
2020s English-language films
2020s Canadian films
LGBT-related science fiction films